Silvia Abascal Estrada (born 20 March 1979) is a Spanish film, television and stage actress. She landed a breakthrough role in 1995 sitcom Pepa y Pepe which advanced her career. She has since featured in films such as The Yellow Fountain, The Wolf, and The Idiot Maiden.

Biography 
Silvia Abascal Estrada was born on 20 March 1979 in Madrid. She made her television debut in the game show Un, dos, tres... responda otra vez, age 14.

She advanced her career with her performance in 1995 sitcom series Pepa y Pepe, in which she played Clarita, the middle sibling in the protagonist family characterised as a sarcastic and macabre yet also sensible grunge-loving teenager. She trained her acting chops under Juan Carlos Corazza. Her performance in The Yellow Fountain as Lola, a half-Spanish half-Chinese wild child, earned her a nomination to the Goya Award for Best New Actress.

She was appointed as Unicef goodwill ambassador in 2003.

In April 2011, Abascal suffered a stroke which temporarily halted her career. Ten months later, she make a comeback to the spotlight attending the gala of the 26th Goya Awards.

Filmography

Film

Television

Theatre 
 La gaviota (2010)
 Días de vino y rosas (2009–10)
 Gatas (2008)
 Siglo XX... que estás en los cielos (2006)
 Historia de una vida (2005)

Awards and nominations

References

External links
 
 

1979 births
Living people
Spanish film actresses
Spanish television actresses
Spanish stage actresses
20th-century Spanish actresses
21st-century Spanish actresses
Actresses from Madrid
UNICEF Goodwill Ambassadors